Shockley Communications Corporation is a media outlet that held several television stations in Wisconsin underneath its ownership. The company was reportedly bought-out by Quincy Newspapers (now Quincy Media) in June 2001.

The Television holdings include WAOW, WKOW, WXOW and WQOW.

Companies based in Wisconsin
Entertainment Studios
2001 mergers and acquisitions
Defunct television broadcasting companies of the United States